Gilbert Armea Garcera (born February 2, 1959) is the Roman Catholic Archbishop of the Archdiocese of Lipa in the Philippines.  He succeeds Archbishop Ramon Arguelles, who earlier filed his resignation prior to his mandatory retirement age in 2017. His previous assignment was the bishop of the Diocese of Daet in Camarines Norte.

Background 

Gilbert Armea Garcera was born in Magarao, Camarines Sur, to Celestino Borja Garcera and Nenita Romero Armea.  He finished his elementary education in 1971 at Naga Parochial School, Naga City and his secondary education in 1975 at Holy Rosary Minor Seminary in Naga City. He continued his studies at Holy Rosary Minor Seminary where he completed Bachelor of Philosophy in 1979 and Bachelor of Sacred Theology in 1983 at the Holy Rosary Major Seminary. The same year, on May 29, he was ordained a priest for the Archdiocese of Caceres.

He received his master's degree in Religious Studies from the Ateneo de Manila University, Quezon City, in 1992, with the thesis "A Proposed Basic Catechetical Formation Program for the Deaf."

In 2004, he completed his Doctor of Philosophy in Organization Development (OD) at the Southeast Asia Interdisciplinary Development Institute (SAIDI), Antipolo, with his dissertation "An OD Intervention in Evolving the Desired Organizational Culture of the Episcopal Commissions of the Catholic Bishop’s Conference of the Philippines (CBCP)."

Presbyterate 
Fr. Garcera's first assignment after his presbyteral ordination was being the assistant parish priest at the Metropolitan Cathedral of Saint John the Evangelist in Naga City, then, as Vice Rector of the Basilica Minore of Our Lady of Penafrancia from 1991 to 1992. He was assigned as rector of San Francisco Parish in Naga City in 1997, where, eventually he became the parish priest after a year.

He was assigned in several ministerial and pastoral duties in the Archdiocese of Caceres. He was appointed the Archdiocesan Director of Caceres Catechetical Ministry from 1987 to 1995. He became the member of the Presbyteral Council of Caceres from 1985 to 1998 and the Commission on Communications from 1988 to 1991. He was elected in the Board of Trustees of Naga Parochial School, Naga City from 1995 to 2001.

From 1992 to 1995, he became the Administrative Director / Personnel Officer in Radio Veritas Asia, then from 2001 to 2003, he was appointed as the Assistant Secretary General and Assistant Treasurer of the Catholic Bishops’ Conference of the Philippines and Managing Editor, CBCP Monitor. He was the member of the Catechism for Filipino Catholics (CFC) Speakers’ Bureau of the Episcopal Commission on Catechesis and Catholic Education (ECCCE) from January 2003 up to the present.

He became the National Director, Ad Interim of the Pontifical Missionary Societies of the Philippines in Manila and Executive Secretary, Ad Interim of the Episcopal Commission on Mission of the Catholic Bishops’ Conference of the Philippines from 2002 to 2003.

He was appointed as the National Director of the Pontifical Missionary Societies of the Philippines in Manila, member of the Superior Council and member of the Asian Delegate for the Restricted Council of Pontifical Missionary Societies from 2004 up to the present.

He was chosen to chair the Congress Program Committee for the Asian Mission Congress in Thailand from January to October 2006 and became the member of the Supreme Committee of Pontifical Missionary Societies, Rome from 2005 to 2010

Bishop of Daet 
On April 4, 2007, he was appointed third Bishop of Daet by Pope Benedict XVI after the resignation of his predecessor, Benjamin J. Almoneda, D.D. was approved. He was ordained Bishop on June 29, 2007, at the Basilica Minore of Our Lady of Peñafrancia, Naga City by Leonardo Z. Legaspi, O.P., D.D., Metropolitan Archbishop of Caceres, together with Benjamin J. Almoneda, D.D., Bishop Emeritus of Daet, and Orlando Quevedo, OMI, D.D., Archbishop of Cotabato.

In October 2015, Garcera was among the six Filipinos out of the 270 cardinals and bishops and 18 couples from the world allowed by Pope Francis to attend the historic Synod of Bishops on the Family at the Vatican.  he chaired the Episcopal Commission on Family and Life and was a member of the CBCP Permanent Council.

Archbishop of Lipa 
On February 2, 2017, Pope Francis appointed him as Archbishop of Lipa, succeeding Ramon Arguelles, who had led the Archdiocese for 13 years. On April 21, 2017, he was installed as the sixth Archbishop of Lipa and on January 17, 2018, the pallium conferred on archbishops who are metropolitans received from Pope Francis during the feast of Sts. Peter and Paul at St. Peter's Basilica was bestowed on him through Archbishop Gabriele Giordano Caccia, Papal Nuncio to the Philippines. The Metropolitan See of Lipa headed by Garcera comprises the Archdiocese of Lipa and its suffragan dioceses of Lucena, Gumaca, Boac, and the Prelature of Infanta.

References

External links 

1959 births
21st-century Roman Catholic archbishops in the Philippines
Living people
Filipino Roman Catholics
People from Camarines Sur
Ateneo de Manila University alumni
Roman Catholic archbishops of Lipa